Baron Béla Bánhidy de Simánd (17 February 1836 – 18 June 1890) was a Hungarian politician and Member of Parliament.

He was elected as a member of the Diet of Hungary in 1875 as an MP for Kisjenő (today: Chişineu-Criş, Romania). After the Occupation of Bosnia and Herzegovina (1878) he withdrew from the Liberal Party and formed the Independent Liberal Party, which soon merged into the Right-wing Opposition. He became first chairman of the newly formed Moderate Opposition, which later was renamed to National Party in 1891.

Bánhidy lost his mandate in the 1878 elections. He conducted journalistic activities for newspapers in Budapest. Later he moved to Arad (today in Romania).

References
 Szinnyei, József: Magyar írók élete és munkái I. (Aachs–Bzenszki). Budapest: Hornyánszky. 1891.

1836 births
1890 deaths
People from Makó
Members of the National Assembly of Hungary
Hungarian journalists
19th-century journalists
Male journalists
19th-century Hungarian male writers